Lucks may refer to:
 Stefan Lucks, a researcher in the fields of communications security and cryptography
 Heiko Lucks, Namibian politician
 Lucks, Virginia, community in the U.S state of Virginia
 Derek Lucks, the main antagonist of Meta Runner

See also
 Luck's Incorporated, a food production company based in North Carolina, now an Arizona Canning Company brand
 Luck (disambiguation)
 Luckes, a surname